Adelphagrotis carissima is a moth of the family Noctuidae. It is found in North America, including California.

External links
Images

Noctuinae
Moths described in 1875
Moths of North America